St. Martin's Engineering College (SMEC) (UGC AUTONOMOUS) is a private engineering college located in Secunderabad, Telangana, India.

History 
St. Martin's Engineering college (UGC Autonomous) is promoted and managed under St. Martin's Children's Educational Society (SMCES) that was established in the year 1982. It was started with a school having student strength of 42. As of today, the society has wide spread into four branches from where more than 7,000 students receive education. St. Martin's Engineering College (SMEC), Secunderabad was established in the year 2002. Currently the student's intake is 1020 with 6 UG programs and 1 PG programs. Total students strength is more than 4000. St. Martin's Engineering College (SMEC) is the only college in Telangana to receive NAAC(A+). Only young college in Telangana to receive UGC-Paramarsh. SMEC situated in an eco-friendly environment, the college has the best infrastructure. engineering programs are NBA accredited, ISO certified, DSIR Recognition, Remote center of IIT Bombay, Member of CII and MSME certified Institution. Signed more than 78 MoUs with major companies’ and institutions. Careers 360 Certified as AA+; Competition Success Review Ranked 3 out of 20; Career Connect Ranked 13 ‘Best Engineering Colleges of India and Wikipedia Ranked 8th in Telangana. The college is bestowed with the glorious Governor Award twice; The Engineering Educators' Award 2019; NIRDPR Award (Govt. of India); IDF Best Partner Award; Dewang Mehta Award; TCS ION Award; CSI Award (Students Chapter); Best Innovation by Federation of Gujarat Industries and Street Cause-Most Dedicated Division. Best college award from education Matter and Best Sports College by Stumagz, Telangana, Award from Street Cause, National Leadership Excellence Award- 2019 by ICCI. Rs.21.46 Lakhs received from SERB, Government of India, Consultancy project worth of Rs.444 Crores received from GHMC – Hyderabad, Government of Telangana. Recently Rs.5 lakhs funding from AICTE also received. The faculty members of the college have published 24 books and 40 patents are published by the faculty members. The crowning glory in academic excellence was achieved by bagging gold medals from University every year. 138 innovative products are developed by students and faculties.

Admissions-intake 
Admissions are made by the Convenor of EAMCET and ICET on Counselling. The institute also admits under the NRI Category.
 Computer Science and Engineering - 240 seats
 Artificial Intelligence and Data Science(AI & DS) - 60 Seats
 Computer Science and Engineering (AI & ML) - 60 Seats
 Electronics and Communication Engineering - 240 seats
 Electrical and Electronic Engineering - 60 seats
 Computer Science & Design (CSD) - 60 Seats
 Information Technology - 60 seats
 Mechanical Engineering - 60 seats
 Civil  Engineering - 60 seats
 MBA - 120 seats
 M.Tech. - Artificial Intelligence and Data Science - 18 Seats

References

Educational institutions established in 2002
Engineering colleges in Hyderabad, India
2002 establishments in Andhra Pradesh